Edward James Hugus (30 June 1923 – 29 June 2006) was an American racing driver.

Cobra dealer
Hugus was the first Shelby Cobra dealer.

Racing career

1957 Venezuelan Grand Prix
Hugus won his class at the 1957 Venezuelan Grand Prix.

24 Hours of Le Mans
Hugus won his class at the 1957 24 Hours of Le Mans.

In the 1965 24 Hours of Le Mans, Hugus is not officially credited as a winner, but legend continues that was a co-driver of the winning car.

Overall, he raced at Le Mans for 10 consecutive years.

Personal life
Hugus was a veteran of World War II.

Racing record

Complete 24 Hours of Le Mans results

Complete 12 Hours of Sebring results

References

External links 
Ed Hugus at racingsportscars.com.

Further reading
 

1923 births
2006 deaths
24 Hours of Le Mans drivers
12 Hours of Sebring drivers
World Sportscar Championship drivers